Joel Hoover is an American former basketball player who played for Maryland Eastern Shore from 1996 to 1999. In 1996–97, he led the NCAA Division I in steals with a 3.21 per game average. He was a freshman when he led the country in steals.

See also
List of NCAA Division I men's basketball season steals leaders

References

Year of birth missing (living people)
Living people
American men's basketball players
Basketball players from New York City
Maryland Eastern Shore Hawks men's basketball players
Point guards
Sportspeople from Brooklyn